Sir Archibald Muir or Mure of Thornton (c.1640–1701) was a Scottish merchant who served as Lord Provost of Edinburgh from 1696 to 1698.

Life
He was born at Thornton near Kilmarnock a descendant of the Mures of Park and Auchindrain. His ancestors included Sir Robert Mure of Caldwell was one of the jury in 1580 at the trial of Lord Ruthven for the murder of David Rizzio. Ruthven was beheaded for his part.

In 1696 he succeeded Robert Chieslie as Lord Provost. He was succeeded in turn by George Home of Kello in 1698.

He was knighted by King William in 1698.

He died in 1701.

Family
He was the cousin of Robert Mure who married Barbara Preston (sister of George Preston), widow of Robert, Lord Sempill.

His daughter Margaret Muir married John Cuninghame of Caddel. The Cuninghames of Caddel inherited the Thornton estate through this marriage, so it is deduced Archibald Muir had no surviving sons.

References

1701 deaths
Scottish businesspeople
Lord Provosts of Edinburgh
Year of birth uncertain